Cerro Gordo County is a county located in the U.S. state of Iowa. As of the 2020 census, the population was 43,127. Its county seat is Mason City. The county is named for the Battle of Cerro Gordo, which took place during the Mexican–American War.

Cerro Gordo County is part of the Mason City, IA Micropolitan Statistical Area.

History
Cerro Gordo County was formed in 1851 and takes its name from the Battle of Cerro Gordo in the Mexican–American War, where General Winfield Scott defeated the Mexican General Santa Anna on April 18, 1847.

In 1851 the first white settlers came into the area of the present county and settled on Clear Lake. Four years later, on August 7, 1855, the first elections were held and the first legal proceedings occurred in 1857. In the summer of the same year, Livonia was chosen as the new county seat. In 1858, the seat was returned to Mason City. In 1866, the first courthouse was erected, which was used until 1900. The courthouse still used today opened on November 17, 1960.

Cerro Gordo County was the site of the airplane crash north of the city of Clear Lake, in which rock and roll stars Buddy Holly, Ritchie Valens, and J.P. "The Big Bopper" Richardson, along with their pilot Roger A. Peterson, were killed on February 3, 1959. The site is in Grant Township, in the northwestern part of the county.

Geography

Major highways 
  Interstate 35
  U.S. Highway 18
  U.S. Highway 65
  Iowa Highway 27
  Iowa Highway 122

Transit
 List of intercity bus stops in Iowa

Airport
The county also has a municipal airport, Mason City Municipal Airport, (MCW).

Adjacent counties
 Worth County  (north)
 Mitchell County  (northeast)
 Floyd County  (east)
 Franklin County  (south)
 Hancock County  (west)

Demographics

2020 census
There were 22,603 housing units of which 19,224 were occupied.

2010 census
There were 22,163 housing units, of which 19,350 were occupied.

2000 census

At the 2000 census there were 46,447 people, 19,374 households, and 12,399 families in the county. There were 21,488 housing units at an average density of 38 per square mile (15/km2). The racial makeup of the county was 96.26% White, 0.80% Black or African American, 0.17% Native American, 0.70% Asian, 0.02% Pacific Islander, 0.88% from other races, and 1.16% from two or more races. 2.78%. were Hispanic or Latino of any race.

Of the 19,374 households 29.10% had children under the age of 18 living with them, 51.90% were married couples living together, 9.10% had a female householder with no husband present, and 36.00% were non-families. 30.90% of households were one person and 13.50% were one person aged 65 or older. The average household size was 2.32 and the average family size was 2.91.

The age distribution was 23.80% under the age of 18, 9.00% from 18 to 24, 26.40% from 25 to 44, 23.20% from 45 to 64, and 17.70% 65 or older. The median age was 39 years. For every 100 females, there were 92.80 males. For every 100 females age 18 and over, there were 89.10 males.

The median household income was $35,867 and the median family income  was $46,099. Males had a median income of $31,790 versus $21,781 for females. The per capita income for the county was $19,184. About 5.90% of families and 8.50% of the population were below the poverty line, including 9.10% of those under age 18 and 8.60% of those age 65 or over.

Communities

Cities

 Clear Lake
 Dougherty
 Mason City
 Meservey
 Plymouth
 Rock Falls
 Rockwell
 Swaledale
 Thornton
 Ventura

Townships
Cerro Gordo County is divided into sixteen townships:

 Bath
 Clear Lake
 Dougherty
 Falls
 Geneseo
 Grant
 Grimes
 Lake
 Lime Creek
 Lincoln
 Mason
 Mount Vernon
 Owen
 Pleasant Valley
 Portland
 Union

Census-designated places
 Burchinal
 Portland

Other unincorporated communities
 Cameron
 Cartersville
 Emery
 Freeman
 Hurley

Population ranking
The population ranking of the following table is based on the 2020 census of Cerro Gordo County.

† county seat

Economy
In September 2016 Cerro Gordo County supervisors voted to appeal the Iowa Department of Natural Resources's decision to approve construction of a hog confinement facility near Ventura, Iowa.

Law enforcement
The Cerro Gordo County Sheriff's Office is headed by Sheriff Kevin Pals. The Sheriff's Office provides law enforcement, performs investigations, executes legal processes such as writs, and is responsible for operating the county jail and for inmates in custody.

The Sheriff's Office is at 17262 Lark Ave, Mason City, IA 50401.

Politics

See also

 National Register of Historic Places listings in Cerro Gordo County, Iowa

References

External links

 County Government website

 
1851 establishments in Iowa
Mason City, Iowa micropolitan area
Populated places established in 1851